The Sherbro language (also known as Southern Bullom, Shiba, Amampa, Mampa, and Mampwa) is an endangered language of Sierra Leone.  It belongs to the Mel branch of the Niger–Congo language family.  While Sherbro has more speakers than the other Bullom languages, its use is declining among the Sherbro people, in favor of Krio and English. 

The first recorded publication in Sherbro is a selection of seven parables from Matthew and Luke in the New Testament.  This was translated by James Schön of the Church Missionary Society (CMS) and published in 1839.

References

External links
 Sherbro entry in the UNESCO Red Book of Endangered Languages

Bullom languages
Endangered languages of Africa
Languages of Sierra Leone